Iotatorquevirus is a genus of viruses in the family Anelloviridae, in group II in the Baltimore classification. It includes one species: Torque teno sus virus 1a.

Virology
The virons are small and non-enveloped.

The viruses are usually acquired soon after birth and may invade virtually any tissue in the body.

They are widespread in the pig population.

Genome
Iotatorqueviruses have a circular, single-stranded DNA genome. The genome is negative-sense.

Clinical
Postweaning multisystemic wasting syndrome has been causally associated with porcine circovirus type 2. The Iotatorquevirus have also been linked with this syndrome but a causative role—if one exists—has yet to be established.

References

External links
ICTV Virus Taxonomy 2009
UniProt Taxonomy
 
 ICTVdb
 ViralZone: Iotatorquevirus

Anelloviridae
Virus genera